The 2012 Pittsburgh Panthers football team represented the University of Pittsburgh in the 2012 NCAA Division I FBS football season. The Panthers were led by first-year head coach Paul Chryst and played their home games at Heinz Field. They were a member of the Big East Conference. This was Pitt's last season as a member of the Big East. Next season, they began play in the ACC.

Schedule

Coaching staff

Roster

Team players drafted into the NFL

References

Pittsburgh Panthers
Pittsburgh Panthers football seasons
Pitts